Sea Fox, SeaFox, Seafox may refer to:

 USS Sea Fox (SS-402), a crewed submarine
 Seafox drone, a remotely operated expendable submarine
 Fairey Seafox, an aeroplane
 A clan in the BattleTech fictional universe